, alternatively titled "Sukiyaki", is a song by Japanese crooner Kyu Sakamoto, first released in Japan in 1961. The song topped the charts in a number of countries, including the U.S. Billboard Hot 100 in 1963.

The song grew to become one of the world's best-selling singles of all time, selling over 13 million copies worldwide.

Composition
"Ue o Muite Arukō" was written by lyricist Rokusuke Ei and composer Hachidai Nakamura. The lyrics tell the story of a man who looks up and whistles while he is walking so that his tears will not fall, with the verses describing his memories and feelings. Ei wrote the lyrics while walking home from participating in the 1960 Anpo protests against the U.S.-Japan Security Treaty, expressing his frustration and dejection at the failed efforts to stop the treaty. However, the lyrics were purposefully generic so that they might refer to any lost love.

The English-language lyrics of the version recorded by A Taste of Honey are not a translation of the original Japanese lyrics, but instead a completely different set of lyrics arranged to the same basic melody.

Cultural significance 
The song spent three weeks at the top of the American Billboard charts in June 1963.  The song is kind of a bitter sweet metaphor for the emerging post World War II global expansion of Japan onto the world scene.    Japans experience of atomic bombs also widely chimed with the heightened threat of global nuclear war during the recent 1962 Cuba missile crisis.

English title
In Anglophone countries, the song is best known under the alternative title "Sukiyaki", the name of a Japanese hot-pot dish with cooked beef. The word sukiyaki does not appear in the song's lyrics, nor does it have any connection to them; it was used only because it was short, catchy, recognizably Japanese, and more familiar to English speakers. A Newsweek columnist compared this re-titling to issuing "Moon River" in Japan under the title "Beef Stew".

Well-known English-language cover versions with altogether different lyrics often go by the alternative name or something completely different, including "My First Lonely Night" by Jewel Akens in 1966, and "Sukiyaki" by A Taste of Honey in 1980 (see below). The song has also been recorded in other languages.

Commercial performance
In Japan, "Ue o Muite Arukō" topped the Popular Music Selling Record chart in the Japanese magazine Music Life for three months, and was ranked as the number one song of 1961 in Japan.

In the US, "Sukiyaki" topped the Billboard Hot 100 chart in 1963, one of the few non-English songs to have done so, and the first in a non-European language. It was the only single by an Asian artist to top the Hot 100 until the 2020 release of "Dynamite" by the South Korean band BTS. "Sukiyaki" also peaked at number eighteen on the Billboard R&B chart, and spent five weeks at number one on the Middle of the Road chart.

Sakamoto's follow-up to "Sukiyaki", "China Nights (Shina no Yoru)", charted in 1963 at number 58. That was the last song by an artist from Japan to reach the US pop chart for 16 years, until the female duo Pink Lady had a top-40 hit in 1979 with its English-language song "Kiss in the Dark".

Internationally, the song is one of the best-selling singles of all time, having sold over 13 million copies worldwide.

Charts

Legacy
An instrumental version of the song was played by NASA over the radio for the Gemini VII astronauts as mood music, thereby becoming one of the first pieces of music sent to humans in space.

On 16 March 1999, Japan Post issued a stamp that commemorated the song. The stamp is listed in the Scott Standard Postage Stamp Catalogue as Japan number 2666 with a face value of 50 yen.

In the summer of 2021, the song was performed during the closing ceremony of the 2020 Olympic Games in Tokyo (which had been postponed due to the COVID-19 pandemic).

Covers and variations (as "Sukiyaki")

A Taste of Honey version

Background
A Taste of Honey vocalist Janice-Marie Johnson would recall how at age nine she had heard Kyu Sakamoto's "Sukiyaki" on the radio in the summer of 1963 and said: "Mom! Buy me this record!", as despite not understanding the lyrics she was deeply moved by the song. Constantly playing the single, Johnson phonetically learned its lyrics and taught them to her sister, with the pair participating in neighborhood talent shows singing "Sukiyaki" while performing their approximation of an Oriental dance number. Years later, after A Taste of Honey had scored their 1978 number-one hit "Boogie Oogie Oogie", Johnson heard the Linda Ronstadt hit remake of Smokey Robinson and the Miracles' "Ooo Baby Baby" on her car radio causing Johnson to realize that remaking a 1960s hit could be a good career move for A Taste of Honey, with Johnson's obvious choice for the remake being her beloved "Sukiyaki". Johnson contacted the song's Japanese lyricist Rokusuke Ei who provided her with a literal translation of what he had written: as this translation did not yield complete sentences in English, Johnson endeavored to write a new set of lyrics she felt would capture the spirit of the song. To Johnson, it seemed the song's original lyrics had 3 possible interpretations: as the mindset of a man facing execution; as someone trying to be optimistic despite life's trials; or as the story of an ended love affair. Johnson decided: "me being the hopeless romantic that I am, I decided to write about a love gone bad."

According to Johnson, when Cecil Hale, vice-president of Capitol Records, heard her sing the lyrics she had written for "Sukiyaki" in the slow balladic style she envisioned for the track, "he said, 'absolutely not! Black people don't want to hear Japanese music.' I was stunned [having been] so sure he would like it. I looked at him and I said 'Last time I looked in a mirror I was black and I want to hear it.'" Producer George Duke, who was assigned to produce the upcoming A Taste of Honey album Twice as Sweet, shared Hale's lack of enthusiasm. Duke recalled: "'Man, what am I going to do with "Sukiyaki"?' I thought [Johnson] was crazy, but I said 'If that's what she wants to do, I'll do it.'" Johnson would recall Duke, "thought we could do a kind of uptempo version [but] I [saw] it as a love ballad, which is how it was done. [Duke] did a fantastic arrangement." Duke replied, "we did the song and had Clare Fischer do the string arrangement and brought June [Kuramoto] in to give it a Japanese flavor" - Kuramoto being a koto player whom Duke knew from the jazz band Hiroshima - "We added an R&B section, and that was it. It was a simple tune I never thought would become a hit. To this day, I can't believe it was as big a record as it was."

Cecil Hale remained resistant to the track: as late as the master for Twice as Sweet being placed on the disc cutter "Sukiyaki" was omitted, the track only being added to Twice as Sweet before the album's August 1980 release after some eleventh hour negotiations between Johnson and Capitol Records, most essentially that Johnson be disallowed credit or royalties for her new lyrics (Capitol Records held the copyright of the Kyu Sakamoto original). After the album's uptempo advance single "Rescue Me" fell short of the R&B chart Top Ten and failed to cross over to the Billboard Hot 100, Johnson urged for "Sukiyaki" to be the next single only for Capitol to issue another uptempo track: "I'm Talkin' 'Bout You", which would stall at number 64 on the R&B chart. Capitol did finally afford single release to "Sukiyaki" in January 1981, the track being both serviced to radio and shipped to retail the first week of the year and being re-serviced to radio two weeks later in a promotional package that included a folding fan: in February 1981 - as "Sukiyaki" moved up the R&B chart Top 40 and began charting on the Bubbling Under Hot 100 - Capitol reinforced the single's radio profile by sending out 6000 custom-cut fan-shaped promo copies of "Sukiyaki" to Pop- and R&B-oriented radio stations. The "Sukiyaki" single was packaged in a picture sleeve showing Johnson and her A Taste of Honey partner, Hazel Payne, wearing kimono, and the duo were similarly dressed in their television performances to promote the single. These performances featured a traditional Japanese fan dance by Johnson, while Payne (who was not featured on the recording of "Sukiyaki") played (or in mimed performances appearing to play) June Kuramoto's koto part. A number-one hit on both the R&B and A/C chart, "Sukiyaki" crossed over to number three on the Billboard Hot 100 in June 1981.

Charts

Weekly charts

Year-end charts

4 P.M. version

American R&B group 4 P.M. released a version of "Sukiyaki" in 1994. This version reached number 8 on the Billboard Hot 100. The group remade the song—utilizing the English-language lyrics of the A Taste of Honey version—at the suggestion of Next Plateau Records president Eddie O'Loughlin. The 4 P.M. version was also a chart success in Australia (number 3), New Zealand (number 5), and Canada (number 7).

Charts
Weekly charts

Year-end charts

Decade-end charts

Certifications

G. H. Hat versions

G. H. Hat released 4 original versions of Sukiyaki and 8 remixed versions of these original tracks in April and July 2018, including remixes by Ralphi Rosario and Dinaire+Bissen. All versions are in the Dance Genre and charted on Billboard's Dance Club Songs Top 50 for 10 weeks with a peak position of number 19. The April versions featured US Singer Alina Renae and used the English Language lyrics written by Janice Marie Johnson. The July versions featured Japanese Super Star Eriko Tamura and used the original Japanese lyrics.

Charts

Other versions
In 1963, the British record label Pye Records released an instrumental cover version of the song by Kenny Ball and his Jazzmen. They were concerned that English-speaking audiences might find the original title too difficult to remember/pronounce, so they gave it the new title of "Sukiyaki". This title was retained when Capitol Records in the United States, and His Master's Voice (HMV) in the UK, released Kyu Sakamoto's original version a few months later.

Electronic artist Soichi Terada sampled the 4 P.M. cover of the song for the track "Sukiyaki Dohyo Chanko" on his 1996 album Sumo Jungle Grandeur.

Many other artists have recorded cover versions of the song, while others have written and/or performed songs based on the melody.

References

External links
 Song lyrics (in rōmaji and English)
 An account of the song (Made in Japan ONLY) (in English)
 Movie(1962) (in Japanese)

1961 songs
1963 singles
1981 singles
1989 singles
1995 singles
A Taste of Honey (band) songs
Billboard Hot 100 number-one singles
Cashbox number-one singles
Capitol Records singles
EMI Latin singles
EMI Music Japan singles
EMI Records singles
His Master's Voice singles
Japanese film songs
Japanese-language songs
Kyu Sakamoto songs
London Records singles
Number-one singles in Norway
Selena songs
Songs written for animated films
Songs with music by Hachidai Nakamura
Song recordings produced by George Duke
Protest songs
Anti-war songs
A cappella songs
Pop ballads
1960s ballads